The Immediate Geographic Region of Salinas is one of the 7 immediate geographic regions in the Intermediate Geographic Region of Montes Claros, one of the 70 immediate geographic regions in the Brazilian state of Minas Gerais and one of the 509 of Brazil, created by the National Institute of Geography and Statistics (IBGE) in 2017.

Municipalities 
It comprises 14 municipalities.

 Berizal  
 Curral de Dentro    
 Fruta de Leite   
 Indaiabira    
 Ninheira   
 Novorizonte    
 Padre Carvalho   
 Rio Pardo de Minas     
 Rubelita    
 Salinas    
 Santa Cruz de Salinas    
 São João do Paraíso     
 Taiobeiras     
 Vargem Grande do Rio Pardo

References 

Geography of Minas Gerais